Philautus erythrophthalmus is a species of frog in the family Rhacophoridae.
It is endemic to Malaysia.

Its natural habitat is subtropical or tropical moist montane forests.
It is threatened by habitat loss.

References

Amphibians of Malaysia
Endemic fauna of Malaysia
erythrophthalmus
Amphibians described in 2000
Taxonomy articles created by Polbot